Mycena noctilucens is a species of agaric fungus in the family Mycenaceae.  The species was first described scientifically by E.J.H. Corner in 1954. Found in Malaysia and the Pacific islands, the mycelium of the fungus is bioluminescent.

See also 
List of bioluminescent fungi

References

External links 

noctilucens
Bioluminescent fungi
Fungi described in 1954
Fungi of Asia
Fungi of Oceania
Fungi without expected TNC conservation status